Holmes–Dakin Building is a historic commercial building located at Hannibal, Marion County, Missouri.  It was built in 1894, and is a two-story brick structure with a coursed rubble foundation and a flat roof. It features a corbelled brick frieze with matching corbelled parapet, capped by a stone molding.  It originally housed a cigar factory.

It was added to the National Register of Historic Places in 1986.

References

Commercial buildings on the National Register of Historic Places in Missouri
Commercial buildings completed in 1894
Buildings and structures in Hannibal, Missouri
National Register of Historic Places in Marion County, Missouri